Action Group is an industrial conglomerate and manufacturer of the Action Shoes brand.

Various subsidiaries
Action Shoes is the most widely known business of the group. The group started from the shoe manufacturing industry and upon its success spread to other fields of steel, chemicals, computer monitors, housing projects, health care and retails. Cricketer Sachin Tendulkar was once its brand ambassador. In the electronic field, the group has two brands of inverters of Microtek and Okaya. The group started with the business of interior infrastructure, named Action Tesa, and in the first year of 2011 had a turnover of ₹1.5 billion (US$22 million). Under the business name of Action Ispat, the group owns two steel projects at Jharsuguda in Orissa and Raipur in Chhattisgarh, each with the capacity of 0.25 million tonnes and planned to expand the Orissa plant to 2.5 metric tons by 2016.

Action Shoes
Action Ispat
Action Chemicals
Action Tesa
Action Retail
Microtek Inverters
Pioneer Flex
Sunsity Projects

Other initiatives
In 2010, the Action Group, along with the NGO Manav Sevarth Trust, opened the Action Cancer Hospital in Delhi. At the time of inauguration, which was done by the then President of India Pratibha Patil, the hospital had 150 beds. It is also associated with Sri Balaji Action Medical Institute, New Delhi.

Court case for Microtek Inverters
Microtek Inverters which is owned by Action Group was sued by a customer in 2003 as a Microtek inverter in his house caught fire due to a short circuit in the inverter's unit. He filed a consumer complaint before the Delhi district forum, and the forum asked Microtek to pay a sum of ₹2,50,000 as compensation to the customer. Microtek filed for a revision before the national commission but lost.

References 

Conglomerate companies of India
Companies based in New Delhi
Indian companies established in 1972
1972 establishments in Delhi
Conglomerate companies established in 1972